This is a list of departments of Haiti by Human Development Index as of 2021.

See also
List of countries by Human Development Index

References 

Haiti
Haiti
Economy of Haiti